Sukkur Barrage is a barrage on the River Indus near the city of Sukkur in the Sindh province of Pakistan. The barrage was built during the British Raj from 1923 to 1932 and was named Lloyd Barrage. The Sukkur Barrage, is the pride of Pakistan's irrigation system as it is the largest single irrigation network of its kind in the world. It irrigates from Sukkur district in the north, to Mirpurkhas/Tharparkar and Hyderabad districts in the south of Sindh, almost all parts of the province. The introduction of barrage-controlled irrigation system resulted in more timely water supplies for the existing cultivated areas of Sindh province of Pakistan.

History
Sindh survives almost entirely on the water of the River Indus as there is very limited groundwater available. Rainfall in the province averages between 100 and 200 mm per year, while the evaporation rate is between 1,000 and 2,000 mm. Thus, Sindh is arid and it is only the Indus which irrigates otherwise barren lands of Sindh. Regular surveys have not been carried out to assess the availability of groundwater in the province. Various sources estimate that its volume is between three and five MAF scattered in 28 per cent of the geographical area of Sindh. However, some experts suggest it to be less than these estimates. This water is found mainly along the Indus water channels and in the few natural underground streams.
The idea of Sukkur Barrage was conceived by Mr. C.A. Fife, in 1868. However, the project was finally sanctioned in 1923. It was constructed under the overall direction of Sir Charlton Harrison, CIE, as chief engineer, while Sir Arnold Musto, CIE, was the architect and engineer of the scheme. The Head Works and Canals were completed by 1932. On its completion it was opened by The 1st Earl of Willingdon, Viceroy of India. The scheme had been launched by the Governor of Bombay, Sir George Lloyd (later known as Lord Lloyd), and it was named in his honour. Pandurang K Shinde [ Esqr, B. A, I.S.E ] offered his engineering services, who was latter responsible for Radhanagari Dam in Maharashtra, India, Syed Ghulam Mustafa of the Imperial Service also played an instrumental role in the design and construction of the barrage.Legendary Indian civil engineer M.Vishveswaraya lent his services for the development of the waterworks.

To revitalise its water storage capacity and distribution efficiency, the Government of Pakistan embarked upon a massive rehabilitation work of Sukkur Barrage. The work was started by Pakistan Army Engineering Corps and Frontier Works Organisation (FWO) on 22 November 2004, and was completed ahead of the deadline in July 2005, with the cost of just 15 million US$ (US dollars). Experts believe that the rehabilitation of the barrage has enhanced its efficiency for another 60 to 70 years.

Functioning
Sukkur Barrage is used to control water flow in the River Indus for the purposes of irrigation and flood control.

In fact Nara Canal is not a man-made canal as it was the southernmost part of Hakro River which emanated from the foothills of Sutlej which after traversing through the Punjab and Bhawalpur plains joined Nara through Raini River, the remnants of which are still exiting in Ghotki District of Sindh Province.

The next largest canal is Rohri Canal which though slightly shorter in length than Nara Canal is yet taking discharge much more than the former. It has cultivable area of  settled for irrigation. Cotton, wheat and sugar-cane are the main crops grown on this canal system. All the four canals on the left and two canals on the right bank of River Indus are perennial canals, delivering irrigation supplies all the year round. The seventh canal namely, Rice Canal on the right side is a seasonal canal which flows only in kharif season and is designed for rice cultivation.

Wildlife
Indus river dolphins are usually seen upstream of the barrage.

See also
 List of barrages and headworks in Pakistan
 List of dams and reservoirs in Pakistan

References

Dams in Pakistan
Tidal barrages
Sukkur District
Irrigation projects
Irrigation in Pakistan
Dams completed in 1932
Dams on the Indus River